Anabarilius xundianensis is a species of cyprinid fish in the family Xenocyprididae. It is endemic to Yunnan (China). It is known from Qingshui Lake in the eponymous Xundian County, on the Jinsha River (a tributary of Yangtze). The exact threats are unknown but it may be fished for food and sensitive to pollution.

References

xundianensis
Cyprinid fish of Asia
Freshwater fish of China
Endemic fauna of Yunnan
Fish described in 1984